Owen Meredith Wilson (September 21, 1909 – November 7, 1998) was an American historian and academic administrator. He served as president of the University of Oregon from 1954 to 1960 and as president of the University of Minnesota from 1960 to 1967.

The son of Guy C. Wilson and Melissa Stevens, Wilson was born in the Mexican Mormon colony of Colonia Juárez, Chihuahua, in 1909. His family was displaced by the Mexican Revolution a few years later and moved to a ranch near the Rio Grande. Wilson attended the University of Utah and Brigham Young University. He received a doctorate from the University of California, Berkeley, in 1943. He taught at the University of Chicago and the University of Utah and researched colonial and revolutionary American history.

Wilson became the ninth president of the University of Oregon in 1954. He was credited with intensifying tenure requirements and creating the Institute of Molecular Biology. In 1960, he left Oregon to become the ninth president of the University of Minnesota. Wilson presided over much of the construction of the West Bank campus, though it had been planned previously. Wilson amended the plans, however, to include a major research library on the West Bank, which now is named in his honor. Wilson left the University of Minnesota in 1967 to become director of the Center for Advanced Study in the Behavioral Sciences, at Stanford University.

Wilson worked as chair of the American Council on Education and headed of the board of Federal Reserve Bank of San Francisco.

Wilson died from brain cancer at his Eugene, Oregon home in 1998, seven weeks past his 89th birthday.

References

1909 births
1998 deaths
20th-century American historians
Historians of the United States
Presidents of the University of Minnesota
Presidents of the University of Oregon
University of Utah alumni
Brigham Young University alumni
University of California, Berkeley alumni
University of Chicago faculty
University of Utah faculty
American Latter Day Saints
Mexican emigrants to the United States
People from Colonia Juárez, Chihuahua
Deaths from brain cancer in the United States
Deaths from cancer in Oregon